Cherlopalle is a neighbourhood located in Tirupati city in Tirupati district of the Indian state of Andhra Pradesh. It forms a part of Tirupati urban agglomeration and is located in Tirupati revenue division.

References 

Tirupati